Peter Billingsley (born April 16, 1971), also known as Peter Michaelsen and Peter Billingsley-Michaelsen, is an American actor and filmmaker. 

His acting roles include Ralphie Parker in the 1983 movie A Christmas Story and its 2022 sequel A Christmas Story Christmas, Jack Simmons in The Dirt Bike Kid, Billy in Death Valley, and Messy Marvin in a series of commercials for Hershey's Syrup in the 1980s. While an infant, he began acting in television commercials.

Early life
Peter was born in New York City. His father, Alwin Michaelsen, is a financial consultant, and his mother, Gail, was once Alwin's secretary. She is the niece of Stork Club owner Sherman Billingsley, and the cousin of Glenn Billingsley who was married to actress Barbara Billingsley.

All five of the children in the family had acting careers when they were young. The older Billingsleys, Dina and Win, had the briefest acting careers working mostly in commercials, with minor guest spots on television shows. Peter's elder sister, Melissa, is best known for her role as Maxx Davis on Me and Maxx. Peter's older brother, Neil, began playing Danny Walton on the daytime soap opera Search for Tomorrow in 1975 and has had numerous roles in commercials and guest shots on TV series.

Peter Billingsley received his early childhood education from a combination of tutors, public schools, and private institutions (including the Professional Children's School in New York City), Phoenix Country Day School in Paradise Valley, Arizona and Longview Elementary School in Phoenix and eventually passed his California High School Proficiency Exam (CHSPE) at the age of 14. He seems to have also attended some public secondary schools prior to passing the CHSPE, including Arcadia High School (in Phoenix).

Billingsley was a spokesman for the young astronaut program and was present in 1986 at launch pad 39B (at NASA's Kennedy Space Center in Florida) for the doomed launch of the Space Shuttle Challenger.

Career
Billingsley's first acting role was when he was 2 in a Geritol commercial. He went on to star in about 120 television advertisements throughout the 1970s and early 1980s. At 12 he was quoted as saying, "After 100 [commercials], you lose count." He was best known for a series of commercials for Hershey's chocolate syrup in which he portrayed the character Messy Marvin. One of Billingsley's earliest film roles was in 1978's If Ever I See You Again, written and directed by Joseph Brooks.

His role in 1981's Paternity opposite Burt Reynolds earned a nomination for "Best Young Comedian – Motion Picture or Television" at the Young Artist Awards. In 1981, he appeared in Honky Tonk Freeway. In 1982, Billingsley starred in several features, including Death Valley, Massarati and the Brain, and the made-for-TV movie Memories Never Die with Lindsay Wagner and his sister, Melissa. He had a featured guest role as Gideon Hale on Little House on the Prairie, began a three-year stint as a co-host on NBC's popular Real People (for which he earned another Young Artist Award nomination), and hosted a two-episode offshoot of the show called Real Kids.

In 1983, Billingsley starred in A Christmas Story, based on Jean Shepherd's In God We Trust, All Others Pay Cash, which built its audience slowly over the years and is now broadcast each year for 24 hours from Christmas Eve until Christmas Day on TBS. The film earned Billingsley another Young Artist Award nomination, and is arguably the one role with which he is most associated. He has been quoted as saying that people still approach him on the street, only to say "you'll shoot your eye out, kid!" After about 40 years, he reprised the role in a sequel film titled A Christmas Story Christmas directed by Clay Kaytis for HBO Max.

In 1984, Billingsley starred in an adaptation of The Hoboken Chicken Emergency with Dick Van Patten and Gabe Kaplan, a special Thanksgiving episode of the PBS series WonderWorks. He appeared on a "Super Teen" special edition of Family Feud, and on Celebrity Hot Potato.

As the late 1980s approached, Billingsley's acting career slowed. He made guest appearances on Who's the Boss?, Punky Brewster, The Wonder Years, and Highway to Heaven. He appeared in The Dirt Bike Kid (for which he won a Young Artist Award), Russkies, and Beverly Hills Brats.

The early 1990s had Billingsley tackling older roles such as a would-be athlete who gets hooked on steroids in the CBS Schoolbreak Special The Fourth Man. On the project he formed a close friendship with Vince Vaughn. His next Schoolbreak Special appearance was in The Writing on the Wall (1994), starring Hal Linden as a rabbi who teaches three boys about the horrors of intolerance after they are caught defacing his home, temple, and car with swastikas and antisemitic graffiti. Billingsley was nominated for an Emmy Award for the role.

Other work
The most rewarding of his later film acting assignments was Arcade (1993), in which he starred as a teenaged "virtual reality" addict; he worked as the postproduction supervisor (credited as Peter Michaelsen). He made some career decisions and began working behind the scenes more often. Known as Peter Michaelsen, he was assistant editor on Knights, a film which featured Kris Kristofferson. In 1994, Peter starred in, wrote, and directed (credited as Peter Billingsley) the short film The Sacred Fire, and credited as Peter Michaelsen as the executive producer. The film won an Academy of Science Fiction, Fantasy and Horror Films' Golden Scroll Award.

His career behind the scenes continued, including work on The Discovery Channel's A.R.K.: The New Adventures of Animal Rescue Kids, The X Show, Made, and Elf, in which he has a cameo appearance.

In 2001, he was nominated for an Emmy Award as co-executive producer for the show Dinner for Five. In 2005, he helped produce the movie Zathura. He was an executive producer for the Universal Pictures production The Break-Up in which he had a small acting role (as Andrew), appearing alongside frequent collaborator Jon Favreau. Billingsley served as executive producer on director Favreau's Iron Man feature film; he also acted in the film playing William Ginter Riva, a scientist who works for Obadiah Stane; he reprised the role later in 2019 in the film Spider-Man: Far From Home. 
Billingsley, Favreau, and Vaughn appeared in Four Christmases (2008). Couples Retreat (2009) starring Favreau and Vaughn was Billingsley's first major film as director and was followed by his second directorial effort Term Life, which also starred Vaughn.

Billingsley's acting career continues, as well, with roles in Family Reunion: A Relative Nightmare, Elf, L.A. Heat, and No Deposit, No Return, which was voted Best Feature Film at the New York International Independent Film and Video Festival in 2000. He took an acting part in an experimental film for the new Maxivision 48 projection system which was developed by Dean Goodhill.

Billingsley released a CD titled Christmas Stories...Christmas Songs on Run For Cover Records in 1999 with longtime friend Brian Evans. He signed on as executive producer of a musical adaptation of A Christmas Story that opened in Seattle in December 2010. He said he was "honored to be a part of this project and looks forward to bringing the play to more stages... Just think about the idea of a leg-lamp kickline."

On January 20, 2022, it was announced that Billingsley was reprising his role as Ralphie in a sequel to A Christmas Story titled A Christmas Story Christmas for Warner Bros. Pictures and HBO Max.

Personal life
Billingsley married Elizabeth "Buffy" Bains in 2015, with whom he has two children.

Filmography

Film

Television

Awards and nominations

References

Further reading 
 Dye, David. Child and Youth Actors: Filmography of Their Entire Careers, 1914-1985. Jefferson, NC: McFarland & Co., 1988, p. 18.
 Holmstrom, John. The Moving Picture Boy: An International Encyclopaedia from 1895 to 1995. Norwich, Michael Russell, 1996, p. 386.

External links

 
 

1971 births
Living people
20th-century American male actors
21st-century American male actors
Film producers from New York (state)
American film producers
American male child actors
American male film actors
American male television actors
American television directors
Television personalities from New York City
Television producers from New York City
Male actors from New York City
Phoenix College alumni
Film directors from Arizona
Film producers from Arizona
Television producers from Arizona